Chinese Physics may refer to:
 Chinese Physics, a scientific journal published by the American Institute of Physics during 1981–1992, which was composed of articles translated from 12 Chinese domestic physical journals.
 Chinese Physics, a scientific journal published by Chinese Physical Society from 2000 to 2007, a continuation of Acta Physica Sinica (Overseas Edition), now Chinese Physics B.
 Scientific journal series published by Chinese Physical Society, which contains
 Communications in Theoretical Physics, with the subtitle Chinese Physics A
 Chinese Physics B
 Chinese Physics C
 Chinese Physics Letters

Physics journals
Chinese Physical Society academic journals